is a Japanese company headquartered in Tokyo, Japan, that offers IT services.

Overview 
Originally, in 1997, Uniadex Ltd. was established by Nihon Unisys Ltd. (Unisys of Japan).
The company offers the services of system integration, cloud computing, information security, and IT lifecycle support in Japan and mostly for enterprises, apart from Nihon Unisys. The company is an official partner of Blue Coat Systems, Cisco Systems, Citrix Systems, Dell EMC, etc.
The business type and scope is the same as Itochu Techno-Solutions and SCSK, these are also companies in Japan and mostly for enterprises. 

Uniadex was known when Nihon Unisys Ltd. acquired Netmarks Inc. from Sumitomo Electric Industries Ltd. by takeover in 2007, and Uniadex Ltd. and Netmarks Inc. was merged in 2014.

See also
 List of companies of Japan

References

External links
 Official website

Cloud computing providers 
Computer security companies 
Information technology consulting firms of Japan
Service companies based in Tokyo 
Technology companies established in 1997
Japanese companies established in 1997